Solapandi (614016) gowtham

Location
Solapandi is located in 7 km from Mannargudi on Muthupet State Highway.

Temples
The Mariamman temple is situated at Middle Street. The deity in the temple includes Ramar Madam, Shivan, Bala Murgan and Vinayakar apart from Mazhai MariAmman.
The Selliamman temple is situated at Kaddukakadu (Solapandi).
The village believes that two ammans are sisters.

Education
A private high school caters to the education up to 10th standard for the students of the village and surrounding areas namely Eathakudi, Thenpathi, Vadapathi and Thalayamangam. The school named after its founder Meenakshi Maariappar is located on the banks of Thiruthinan Kulam.

Another Matriculation school is situated in solapandi named as Krishna Matriculation School up to 5th standard

Hang-outs
TASMAC shop with Bar facility is present in the village serving the people in and around the village.

A Public Library is situated in the village.
There is a post office.

Economy
The economy of Solapandi relies heavily on farming. Farmers grow paddy mostly as Sambha crop which is 5 to 6 months old crop. Black gram, Green gram and gingelly are sown once paddy is harvested in the month of January. Most of farmers use canal irrigation system from Pamani river. Very few farmers have borewells in their farm and produce crops three times a year (kuruvai, taladi and kodai).

Politics
Solapandi village comes under Thalayamangalam panchayat village which comprises 3 villages namely Thalayamangalam, Solapandi and Rajagopalapuram. The president of village is Mrs. Kalairani Balakrishnan (from 2020).

List of Presidents

See also
Mannargudi

References 

Villages in Tiruvarur district